Franklin School is a historic school located at Schenectady in Schenectady County, New York. It was built in 1907 and is a two-story, red brick "H" shaped institutional building in the Georgian Revival style.  It is trimmed with yellow brick and stone.  There are massive yellow brick pilasters at the corner of the pavilions and recessed rectangular panels.  It operated as a school by the Schenectady City School District until 1974.

It was added to the National Register of Historic Places in 1983.

The building is identical to the former Horace Mann School, listed on the National Register of Historic Places in 2015.

References

School buildings on the National Register of Historic Places in New York (state)
Georgian Revival architecture in New York (state)
School buildings completed in 1907
Schools in Schenectady County, New York
National Register of Historic Places in Schenectady County, New York
1907 establishments in New York (state)